Maacher Jhol may refer to:

 Maacher Jhol (2017 feature film)
 Maacher Jhol (2017 short film)